Leonard Teeuws (April 19, 1927 – July 14, 2006) was an American football offensive tackle/defensive tackle in the National Football League. He played two seasons for the Los Angeles Rams (1952–1953) and four seasons for the Chicago Cardinals (1954–1957). Teeuws attended Tulane University.

External links

Stats from databasefootball.com

1927 births
2006 deaths
Sportspeople from Oak Park, Illinois
American football defensive tackles
American football offensive tackles
Tulane Green Wave football players
Los Angeles Rams players
Chicago Cardinals players